Tunel or Tünel may refer to:

 TUNEL assay (Terminal deoxynucleotidyl transferase mediated dUTP Nick End Labeling assay), in genetics, a method for detecting DNA fragmentation
 Tunel (band), Yugoslav rock band
 Tunel (railroad station), railroad station in Poland
 Tünel, a historical underground funicular in Istanbul, Turkey
 Tünel, Khövsgöl, a Mongolian sum
 Tunel, a brand  of Herbs de Majorca

See also
 
 

 Tunnel (disambiguation)
 Tune (disambiguation)